This page provides supplementary chemical data on carbon monoxide.

Material safety data sheet 

The handling of this chemical may incur notable safety precautions. It is highly recommended that you seek the material safety data sheet (MSDS) for this chemical from a reliable source such as SIRI, and follow its directions.
 MSDS from Advanced Gas Technologies in the SDSdata.org database

Structure and properties

Thermodynamic properties

Spectral data

References 

Chemical data pages
Carbon monoxide
Chemical data pages cleanup